The Women's Prize for Fiction (previously called Orange Prize for Fiction (1996–2006 & 2009–12), Orange Broadband Prize for Fiction (2007–2008) and Baileys Women's Prize for Fiction (2014–2017) is one of the United Kingdom's most prestigious literary prizes, annually awarded to a female author of any nationality for the best original full-length novel written in English, and published in the United Kingdom in the preceding year. The prize was originally due to be launched in 1994 with the support of Mitsubishi but public controversy over the merits of the award caused the sponsorship to be withdrawn. Funding from Orange, a UK mobile network operator and Internet service provider, allowed the prize to be launched in 1996 by a committee of male and female "journalists, reviewers, agents, publishers, librarians, booksellers", including current Honorary Director Kate Mosse.

In May 2012, it was announced that Orange would be ending its sponsorship of the prize. In 2012, the award was formally known as the "Women's Prize for Fiction", and was sponsored by "private benefactors" led by Cherie Blair and writers Joanna Trollope and Elizabeth Buchan. In 2013, the new sponsor became Baileys. In January 2017 the company announced that it was the last year that they would sponsor the prize. In June 2017, the prize announced it would change its name to simply "Women's Prize for Fiction" starting in 2018, and will be supported by a family of sponsors.

The prize was established to recognise the contribution of female writers, whom Mosse believed were often overlooked in other major literary awards, and in reaction to the all-male shortlist for the 1991 Booker Prize. The winner of the prize receives £30,000, along with a bronze sculpture called the Bessie created by artist Grizel Niven, the sister of actor and writer David Niven. Typically, a longlist of nominees is announced around March each year, followed by a shortlist in June; within days the winner is announced. The winner is selected by a board of "five leading women" each year. In 2005, judges named Andrea Levy's Small Island as the "Orange of Oranges", the best novel of the preceding decade.

The BBC suggests that the prize forms part of the "trinity" of UK literary prizes, along with the Booker Prize and the Costa Book Awards; the sales of works by the nominees of these awards are significantly boosted. Levy's 2004 winning book sold almost one million copies (in comparison to less than 600,000 for the Booker Prize winner of the same year), while sales of Helen Dunmore's A Spell of Winter quadrupled after being awarded the inaugural prize. Valerie Martin's 2003 award saw her novel sales increase tenfold after the award, and British libraries, who often support the prize with various promotions, reported success in introducing people to new authors: "48% said that they had tried new writers as a result of the promotion, and 42% said that they would try other books by the new authors they had read."

However, the fact that the prize singles out female writers is not without controversy. After the prize was founded, Auberon Waugh nicknamed it the "Lemon Prize" while Germaine Greer claimed there would soon be a prize for "writers with red hair". Winner of the 1990 Booker Prize, A. S. Byatt, called it a "sexist prize", claiming "such a prize was never needed." In 1999, the chairwoman of the judges, Lola Young, said that the British fiction they were asked to appraise fell into two categories, either "insular and parochial" or "domestic in a piddling kind of way", unlike American authors who "take small, intimate stories and set them against this vast physical and cultural landscape which is very appealing." Linda Grant suffered accusations of plagiarism following her award in 2000, while the following year, a panel of male critics produced their own shortlist and heavily criticised the genuine shortlist. Though full of praise for the winner of the 2007 prize, the chair of the judging panel Muriel Gray decried the fact that the shortlist had to be whittled down from "a lot of dross", while former editor of The Times Simon Jenkins called it "sexist". In 2008, writer Tim Lott called the award "a sexist con-trick" and said, "the Orange Prize is sexist and discriminatory, and it should be shunned".

No woman has won the award more than once but Margaret Atwood has been nominated three times without a win. Hilary Mantel was shortlisted three times without winning, for Beyond Black (2005) and the first two novels in her Tudor trilogy, Wolf Hall (2009) and Bring Up The Bodies (2012), which both won the Booker Prize. The third book in the trilogy, The Mirror and the Light, was shortlisted in April 2020, a year in which the award (usually given in May) was postponed to September. Since the inaugural award to Helen Dunmore, British writers have won five times, while North American authors have secured the prize nine times.

Recipients

1990s

2000s

2010s

2020s

Notes

See also
Orange Award for New Writers
List of British literary awards
List of years in literature

References

External links
Women's Prize for Fiction, official website
Shortlisted works for the Orange Prize at LibraryThing

Baileys

Women-related lists